Barbara Wohlfarth is a Swedish, German and Swiss Quaternary geologist and paleoclimatologist active at Stockholm University. In 2012, she was elected into the Royal Swedish Academy of Sciences.

References

21st-century Swedish geologists
Swedish geographers
Swedish women geologists
Swedish women academics
Quaternary geologists
Paleoclimatologists
Academic staff of Stockholm University
Members of the Royal Swedish Academy of Sciences
Living people
Year of birth missing (living people)